McGreevy is a surname. Notable people with the surname include:

John McGreevy (born 1963), American historian
John H. C. McGreevy (1913–2004), Canadian military officer and school director
Michael McGreevy (born c. 1999), American baseball player
Michael T. McGreevy (1865–1943), American businessman and baseball fanatic
Molly McGreevy (1936–2015), American actress
Sean McGreevy, Northern Ireland goalkeeper in Gaelic football
Thomas McGreevy (1825–1897), Canadian politician

See also
MacGreevy
McGreevey